Zhana Nikolova-Gŭlŭbova (1908–2009) was a Bulgarian philology scientist, essayist and publicist. She is the author of literary and linguistic research, and philosophical essays. Her main scientific interests are in the field of literary criticism and lexicography. Moreover, she is also a certified translator and editor. She was the first woman teaching in the Sofia University. She is the bearer of the highest honorary degree of the Bulgarian Academy of Sciences - Doctor Honoris Causa. She lived up to 101 years, before passing away in 2009.

Life path 
Zhana was born on 22 February 1908 in Trun in the family of a teacher father and an artist mother. In 1911, her family moves to Tsaribrod. She studies in a high-school in Sofia, after the family moves there as refugees due to the Balkan Wars. In 1926, she starts studying philology in the Sofia University. She graduates in 1931 as a specialist in classical philology and German philology. She then travels to Germany and specializes in philosophy.

In 1936, publisher house "Hemus" releases her first book - "The tongue of young Goethe". During the same year, she was also chosen through a competition to become a teacher in the same university which makes her the first woman in Bulgarian History to ever teach in a university.

With the support of Elin Pelin, and Yordan Yovkov, she also becomes a member of the Writer Union in Bulgaria. In 1945, she was later accused of spreading fascist propaganda by the communist government and removed from lecturing in the university, as well as removed from the Writer Union and prohibited from publishing any literary works.

In 1999, she receives the honorary degree of the Bulgarian Academy of Sciences - Doctor Honoris Causa.

Creative path 

Nikolova-Gŭlŭbova is one of the essential figures in the development of Bulgarian essayists. Her name is often associated with others famous Bulgarian authors like Elisaveta Bagryana and Dora Gabe.

She greatly loves and knows Bulgarian literature, although she mainly specializes in German authors. She did many analysis works on Yordan Yovkov, Ekaterina Nencheva, Ivan Vazov, Dimcho Debelyanov, and Atanas Dalchev.

Her dictionaries later become the fundamental works which were in devising Bulgarian-German thesaurus and dictionaries. She has been actively writing during a period of 60 years, publishing more than 20,000 articles.

References 

1908 births
2009 deaths
Bulgarian women
Bulgarian women academics
Bulgarian centenarians